Janez Lindauer was a politician in Slovenia during the early 16th century when it was under the Holy Roman Empire. He became mayor of Ljubljana in 1509.
He was succeeded by Volk Meditsch in 1511.

References 

Year of birth missing
Year of death missing
16th-century Slovenian people
Mayors of places in the Holy Roman Empire
Mayors of Ljubljana